Laguna Beach is a census-designated place (CDP) in Bay County, Florida, United States. The population was 3,932 at the 2010 census. It is part of the Panama City–Lynn Haven–Panama City Beach Metropolitan Statistical Area. Laguna Beach was named for the many coastal dune lakes unique to this area of Northwest Florida.

Geography
Laguna Beach is located at  (30.249553, -85.939552).

Demographics

As of the census of 2010, there were 3,932 people, 1,816 households, and 1,022 families residing in the CDP. The racial makeup of the CDP was 91.8% White, 1.1% African American, 1.2% American Indian or Alaska Native, 0.8% Asian, 0.1 Native Hawaiian or other Pacific Islander, 2.3% some other race, and 2.7% from two or more races. 5.8% of the population were Hispanic or Latino of any race.

There were 1,816 households, out of which 17.9% had children under the age of 18 living with them, 40.6% were headed by married couples living together, 8.9% had a female householder with no husband present, and 43.7% were non-families. 31.9% of all households were made up of individuals, and 11.1% were someone living alone who was 65 years of age or older.  The average household size was 2.17, and the average family size was 2.66.

In the CDP, the population was spread out, with 16.3% under the age of 18, 7.8% from 18 to 24, 24.5% from 25 to 44, 31.9% from 45 to 64, and 19.5% who were 65 years of age or older.  The median age was 45.7 years. For every 100 females, there were 102.6 males.  For every 100 females age 18 and over, there were 102.8 males.

At the 2000 census, the median income for a household in the CDP was $34,875, and the median income for a family was $41,629. Males had a median income of $26,294 versus $20,488 for females. The per capita income for the CDP was $18,209.  About 11.5% of families and 14.8% of the population were below the poverty line, including 17.2% of those under age 18 and 12.2% of those age 65 or over.

References

Census-designated places in Bay County, Florida
Beaches of Florida
Census-designated places in Florida
Populated coastal places in Florida on the Gulf of Mexico
Beaches of Bay County, Florida